The Jean Ferrand Trophy has been awarded to the best goaltender in the Ligue Magnus since 1978. It is named after Jean Ferrand, a former French ice hockey goaltender.

Winners

External links
 Fédération Française de Hockey sur Glace

Awards established in 1978
French ice hockey trophies and awards
France
Ligue Magnus
1978 establishments in France